The following is a list of episodes of the Colombian telenovela Nurses, which premiered on 23 October 2019 on RCN Televisión and ended its first season on 20 March 2020 due to the COVID-19 pandemic in Colombia. On 12 January 2021, the new episodes were resumed with the broadcast of a second season.

Series overview

Episodes

Season 1 (2019–20)

Season 2 (2021–22)

References 

Nurses